Everette Sargeant (born 21 January 1955) is a Nevisian cricketer. He played in five first-class and seven List A matches for the Leeward Islands from 1978 to 1984.

See also
 List of Leeward Islands first-class cricketers

References

External links
 

1955 births
Living people
Nevisian cricketers
Leeward Islands cricketers